"Luv 4 Dem Gangsta'z", also known as Luv 4 Dem G'z, is a single by Eazy-E from the Beverly Hills Cop III soundtrack, the single was later included on Eazy-E's compilation, Featuring…Eazy-E.

History
The song was released in 1994 and was written by Eazy-E, Kevyn "Ruthless Dirty Red" Carter and Doctor Jam and produced by Doctor Jam and Eazy-E. The guitar solo was performed by Slash.  Luv 4 Dem Gangsta'z is notable for being the only single by Eazy-E to not be released for his label, Ruthless Records, as it was released for MCA Records.  Luv 4 Dem Gangsta'z peaked at #1 on the Bubbling Under R&B/Hip-Hop Singles and #3 on the Bubbling Under Hot 100 Singles.

The song was also covered by the Insane Clown Posse with affiliate Cold 187um on The Mighty Death Pop!'s bonus album Smothered, Covered & Chunked''. It was later sampled in 2014 by Sander Van Doorn and Firebeatz for their song "Guitar Track."

Charts

Single track listing
"Luv 4 Dem Gangsta'z" (Original Clean)- 4:34
"Luv 4 Dem Gangsta'z" (Funky Clean)- 4:35
"Luv 4 Dem Gangsta'z" (Clean Chorus Re-Edit)- 4:34
"Luv 4 Dem Gangsta'z" (Instrumental)- 4:28

Eazy-E songs
1994 singles
Gangsta rap songs
G-funk songs
1994 songs